Admiralteysky District is a district of the federal city of St. Petersburg, Russia. As of the 2010 Census, its population: was 157,897; down from 187,837 recorded in the 2002 Census.

Geography
The district borders the Neva River in the north and in the west, the Yekateringofka River in the southwest, areas around Gorokhovaya Street in the east, and areas around Zagorodny Avenue in the south.

History
It was established on March 11, 1994 as a result of the merger of Leninsky and Oktyabrsky Districts.

Municipal divisions
Admiralteysky District comprises the following six municipal okrugs:
Admiralteysky
Izmaylovskoye
Kolomna
Semyonovsky
Sennoy
Yekateringofsky

References

Notes

Sources

 
States and territories established in 1994